Jörn Johan Donner (5 February 1933 – 30 January 2020) was a Finnish writer, film director, actor, producer, politician and founder of Finnish Film Archive.

Biography
Born into the Donner family of German descent, Jörn Donner was the son of the linguist Kai Donner and the grandson of linguist and politician Otto Donner.

He lived and worked for long periods in Sweden, and served as director of the Swedish Film Institute. In 1979, he was a member of the jury at the 29th Berlin International Film Festival. Internationally Jörn Donner was best known as the producer of Ingmar Bergman's film Fanny and Alexander (1982). In 1984 the movie won a total of four Academy Awards including the award for best foreign language film, making him to date the only Finn to receive an Oscar. His novel  (Father and Son) won  the Finlandia Prize in 1985.

Donner was associated with several different political parties, such as SDP and RKP, and was at different times a member both of the Finnish parliament and the European Parliament.  he was again a member of the Finnish parliament for a short while, after Eva Biaudet resigned to take a position at the OSCE.

Donner suffered from prostate and lung cancers. He died of lung disease at Meilahti hospital in Helsinki on 30 January 2020, six days before his 87th birthday.

Filmography
 (A Sunday in September, 1963)
, (To Love, 1964)
, (Adventure Starts Here, 1965)
 (Rooftree, 1967)
Stimulantia (1967)
, (Black on White, 1968)
 (1969)
Anna (1970)
 (1970)
 (1971)
 (1972)
 (1973)
Near and Far Away (1976)
 (1978)
Men Can't Be Raped (1978)
Bergman File, The (1978)
 (1982)
Dirty Story (1984)
/ (1988)
 (1998)
 (2000)
The Border (Raja 1918, 2007)
Kuulustelu (2009)
Armi elää! (2015)

Bibliography

    1951 – . Söderström. 
    1952 – 
    1954 – . Söderström. 
    1955 – . Söderström. 
    1957 – . Söderström. 
    1958 – . Schildts. 
    1960 – . Söderström. 
    1961 – . Söderström. 
    1962 – . Söderström. 
    1962 – . Söderström. 
    1967 – . Söderström. 
    1968 – . Söderström. 
    1968 – 
    1971 – . Söderström. 
    1972 – . Söderström. 
    1973 – . Wahlström & Widstrand. 
    1974 – . Söderström. 
    1976 – . Wahlström & Widstrand. 
    1976 – . Söderström. 
    1978 – . Söderström. 
    1980 – . Söderström. 
    1981 – . Söderström. 
    1982 – . Söderström. 
    1982 – . 
    1984 – . Wahlström & Widstrand. 
    1985 – . Söderström. 
    1985 – . . 
    1986 – . Söderström. 
    1986 – . Söderström. 
    1989 – . Söderström. 
    1990 – . Söderström. 
    1991 – Fazer 100. Söderström. 
    1992 – . Söderström. 
    1993 – . Söderström. 
    1993 – 
    1994 – . Söderström. 
    1998 –  Söderström. 
    2001 – . Söderström. 
    2002 – . Söderström. 
    2004 – . Söderström. 
    2004 – . Söderström. 
    2005 – . Aamulehti. 
    2006 – . Söderström. 
    2006 – . Söderström. 
    2007 – . Schildts. 
    2009 – . Ekerlid. 
    2011 – . Söderström. 
    2013 – . Schildts & Söderströms. 
    2015 – . Schildts & Söderströms. 
    2015 – . Albert Bonniers Förlag. 
    2019 – . .

See also
Donner family

References

External links

 
 
 Jörn Donner in 375 Humanists. Faculty of Arts, University of Helsinki. 28.7.2015.
 

1933 births
2020 deaths
Writers from Helsinki
Finnish people of German descent
Finnish People's Democratic League politicians
Swedish People's Party of Finland politicians
Social Democratic Party of Finland politicians
Members of the Parliament of Finland (1987–91)
Members of the Parliament of Finland (1991–95)
Members of the Parliament of Finland (2003–07)
Members of the Parliament of Finland (2011–15)
Social Democratic Party of Finland MEPs
MEPs for Finland 1996–1999
Finnish writers in Swedish
Finnish film producers
Finnish film directors 
Finlandia Prize winners
Producers who won the Best Film Guldbagge Award
Finnish film critics
Male actors from Helsinki
Finnish expatriates in Sweden
Donner family
Deaths from lung disease